Planiplax is a genus of skimmers in the dragonfly family Libellulidae. There are about five described species in Planiplax.

Species
These five species belong to the genus Planiplax:
 Planiplax arachne Ris, 1912
 Planiplax erythropyga (Karsch, 1891)
 Planiplax machadoi Santos, 1949
 Planiplax phoenicura Ris, 1912
 Planiplax sanguiniventris (Calvert, 1907) (Mexican scarlet-tail)

References

Further reading

 
 
 
 

Libellulidae
Articles created by Qbugbot
Taxa described in 1891